Kampene Airport  is an airport serving the town of Kampene in Maniema Province, Democratic Republic of the Congo.

See also

 Transport in the Democratic Republic of the Congo
 List of airports in the Democratic Republic of the Congo

References

External links
 OurAirports - Kampene Airport
 FallingRain - Kampene Airport
 HERE Maps - Kampene
 OpenStreetMap - Kampene
 

Airports in Maniema